The Young Bretons Movement, Breton Ar Vretoned Yaouank, is the youth section of the Breton Party. It was founded in March 2007.

Launch and Ideas

The YBM/AVY was launched officially at a Breton Party Congress in Blain, in March 2007. At the beginning, it was formed of a few members of the party willing to make actions and proposals specific to the youth. At their launch, the Young Bretons published the "Young Bretons Manifesto", in which they denounce what they think are France's failures on the political, economical and cultural fields. They criticized the French attitude towards Europe and the failure of decentralization and public reforms in general, and called out to "emancipation" and reunification of Brittany, within a federal Europe.

As the Breton Party, the YBM/AVY advocates a new approach to Breton issues, by emphasizing the European dimension of their ideas : they reject the idea of identity withdrawal and claim they want to simply exist as the other countries. The lead idea of the Manifesto is the point that in a European framework, which is the movement's reference, Brittany is a country like any other, and therefore must have the same political rights as Estonia, Slovenia or Ireland.

In March 2008, for the city council elections, the Young Bretons publish a document called "It’s now we must change things", which summarizes their proposals on topics specific to youth such as housing or universities. They propose, among other items, to struggle against the building of secondary homes on the seaside, or to create a Breton university system which regroups universities and colleges, all this within the framework of Brittany as a member of the European Union.

Main subjects

Beyond the institutional issues, the YBM/AVY mainly addresses the European, university and environment issues. Thus, they have several times advocated a federal Europe and criticized French policies towards Europe, that are in their opinion not enough in favour of European integration.
The movement often takes a stand on university reforms : thus, it denounced the 2007 University Freedom and Responsibility Act which, in their opinion, is a mere transfer of expenses without a real autonomy. Likewise, the YBM/AVY opposes introducing student fees and takes as an example the Welsh universities. It also calls out to the regional council to make up for the state's reduction of expenses as far as help for disabled persons is concerned.
The Young Bretons also organized campaigns to raise the public awareness on issues linked with the seaside, in particular housing. They denounced the bulge of secondary homes and proposed a stronger seaside act, as well as a limitation (by tax) of the numbers of buildings, as well as the creation of protected markets.

Magazine

Since the end of 2008, the Young Bretons have published a webzine called Yaouankiz (Youth) three times a year. It aims at broadcasting their ideas on current issues (economy, social) or on theories (Breton nationalism). The webzine is published on their website.

Relations with other organizations

Since the beginning, the YBM/AVY has had relations with other nationalist movements in Europe, whether from the centre-left or the centre-right. In December 2006, they participated in Bilbao in the international youth days for self-determination, organized by Euzko Gaztedi (EGI). They have links with YEN (Youth of European Nationalities – gathering youth associations from national or cultural minorities in Europe), and participated in several of their seminars.
In August 2008, the movement organized their first summer days, together with Flemish and Basque representatives, from Nieuw-Vlaamse Alliantie and EGI. On the occasion of these days is written the "Lorient Declaration on self-determination" where they denounce the attitude of some European governments, which, according to the text, slow down the decision process of the citizens on their institutions.

See also 
 Breton Party
 Social-democracy
 Liberal democracy

External links 
 Official site
    Lorient Declaration on self-determination signed by Ar Vretoned Yaouank/Young Bretons Movement and by youth movements from the Bsque country and Flandersm in five languages
 Le MJB et la construction européenne - le Taurillon

Political parties established in 2002
Social democratic parties in France
Political parties in Brittany
Breton nationalist parties
2002 establishments in France